The 1993 Winston 500 was the ninth stock car race of the 1993 NASCAR Winston Cup Series season and the 24th iteration of the event. The race was held on Sunday, May 2, 1993, before an audience of 145,000 in Lincoln, Alabama at Talladega Superspeedway, a 2.66 miles (4.28 km) permanent triangle-shaped superspeedway. The race took the scheduled 188 laps to complete. After a rain-delay late into the race, NASCAR officials determined to let the race finish under a two-lap shootout. In a late-race charge, Morgan–McClure Motorsports driver Ernie Irvan would manage to charge from fourth to first on the final lap to take his seventh career NASCAR Winston Cup Series victory and his first victory of the season. To fill out the top three, Bobby Allison Motorsports driver Jimmy Spencer and Joe Gibbs Racing driver Dale Jarrett would finish second and third, respectively.

At the finish of the race, Rusty Wallace would suffer a major crash while crossing the finish line. Coming to the finish, Dale Earnhardt would send Wallace into an airborne spin, sending Wallace into a series of flips and tumbles, crossing the finish line in sixth. With the car destroyed, Wallace was transferred to a Birmingham, Alabama hospital where he was diagnosed with a concussion and a broken left wrist.

Background 

Talladega Superspeedway, originally known as Alabama International Motor Superspeedway (AIMS), is a motorsports complex located north of Talladega, Alabama. It is located on the former Anniston Air Force Base in the small city of Lincoln. The track is a tri-oval and was constructed in the 1960s by the International Speedway Corporation, a business controlled by the France family. Talladega is most known for its steep banking and the unique location of the start/finish line that's located just past the exit to pit road. The track currently hosts the NASCAR series such as the NASCAR Cup Series, Xfinity Series and the Camping World Truck Series. Talladega is the longest NASCAR oval, a  tri-oval like the Daytona International Speedway, which also is a  tri-oval.

Entry list 

 (R) denotes rookie driver.

Qualifying 
Qualifying was split into two rounds. The first round was held on Friday, April 30, at 4:00 PM EST. Each driver would have one lap to set a time. During the first round, the top 20 drivers in the round would be guaranteed a starting spot in the race. If a driver was not able to guarantee a spot in the first round, they had the option to scrub their time from the first round and try and run a faster lap time in a second round qualifying run, held on Saturday, May 1, at 11:30 AM EST. As with the first round, each driver would have one lap to set a time. For this specific race, positions 21-32 would be decided on time, and depending on who needed it, a select amount of positions were given to cars who had not otherwise qualified but were high enough in owner's points; up to two were given. If needed, a past champion who did not qualify on either time or provisionals could use a champion's provisional, adding one more spot to the field.

Nine drivers would fail to qualify.

Full qualifying results

Race results

Standings after the race 

Drivers' Championship standings

Note: Only the first 10 positions are included for the driver standings.

References

Winston 500
Winston 500
NASCAR races at Talladega Superspeedway
May 1993 sports events in the United States